Griphognathus whitei is an extinct species of lungfish from the late Devonian period of Europe and Australia.

References

Prehistoric lungfish
Late Devonian animals
Late Devonian fish
Devonian bony fish